Remo Galli (3 July 1912 – 12 June 1993) was an Italian professional football player and coach. He was born in Montecatini Terme.

Honours
 Coppa Italia winner: 1935/36.

References

1912 births
Year of death missing
Italian footballers
Serie A players
A.C. Prato players
S.S. Scafatese Calcio 1922 players
Modena F.C. players
Inter Milan players
Torino F.C. players
S.S.D. Lucchese 1905 players
Italian football managers
Palermo F.C. managers
Association football forwards
S.S. Maceratese 1922 players